The Fifth Estate is an English-language Canadian investigative documentary series that airs on the national CBC Television network.

The name is a reference to the term "Fourth Estate", and was chosen to highlight the program's determination to go beyond everyday news into original journalism. The program has been on the air since 16 September 1975, and its primary focus is on investigative journalism. It has engaged in co-productions with the BBC, The New York Times, The Globe and Mail, the Toronto Star, and often with the PBS program Frontline.

The Fifth Estate is one of two television programs (with The Twilight Zone being the first) to win an Academy Award, a prize presented to theatrical films: Just Another Missing Kid, originally a The Fifth Estate episode, was released in theatres in the United States and won the 1982 Academy Award for Documentary Feature.

Journalists
Journalists associated with the show, past and present, include:

 Theresa Burke
 Marie Caloz
 Stevie Cameron
 Harvey Cashore
 Adrienne Clarkson
 Neil Docherty
 Gillian Findlay
 Declan Hill
 Hana Gartner
 Ron Haggart
 Bob Johnstone
 Mark Kelley
 Joe MacAnthony
 Linden MacIntyre
 Bob McKeown
 Sheila MacVicar
 Victor Malarek
 Eric Malling
 Habiba Nosheen
 Ian Parker
 Francine Pelletier
 Sally Reardon
 Peter Reilly
 Glenn Sarty
 David Studer
 Robin Taylor
 Warner Troyer
 Anna Maria Tremonti
 Jim Williamson
 Trish Wood

Episodes
News reports aired on The Fifth Estate have included investigations into and reports about:

 9/11 Truth movement
 Death of Ashley Smith
 Airbus affair, Brian Mulroney and Karlheinz Schreiber
 William Francis Melchert-Dinkel
 Airport Security
 Al-Qaeda in Europe
 Benny Hinn
 Brendan Burke
 Brandon Crisp
 Chris Benoit ("Wrestler: Fight to the Death")
 Chuckie Akenz
 Charles Manson and the Manson Family
 Scouts Canada
 Communications Security Establishment
 David Frost and Mike Danton
 École Polytechnique massacre ("Montreal Massacre – Legacy of Pain")
 Jian Ghomeshi
 Rob Ford
 Dick Cheney
 MIM-104 Patriot and its ineffectiveness during the Gulf War as a missile defense system
 Guy Paul Morin
 Suicide of Amanda Todd
 Jane and Finch
 Ontario Lottery and Gaming Corporation ("Luck of the Draw")
 Pierre Vallières
 Polygamy in Bountiful, British Columbia
 PROFUNC
 Steven Truscott
 To Sell a War
 Tunagate
 David Russell Williams
 Mark Twitchell
 Donald Trump
 Iglesia ni Cristo
Julian Assange

Season 34 (2008–09)
The 2008–09 television season was the 34th season of The Fifth Estate.

Season 36 (2010–11)
The 2010–11 television season was the 36th season of The Fifth Estate.

Season 37 (2011–12)
The 2011–12 television season was the 37th season of The Fifth Estate.

Season 38 (2012–13)
The 2012–13 television season was the 38th season of The Fifth Estate.

Season 39 (2013–14)
The 2013–14 television season was the 39th season of The Fifth Estate.

Season 43 (2017–18)
The 2017–18 television season was the 43rd season of The Fifth Estate.

Season 45 (2019–20)
The 2019–20 television season is the 45th season of The Fifth Estate. (Where two episodes appear in one program, a "/" is included between the episodes.)

Season 46 (2020–21) 
The 2020–21 television season is the 46th season of The Fifth Estate. (Where two episodes appear in one program, a "/" is included between the episodes.)

Awards
The Fifth Estate has won many awards, including Gemini Awards—among them ten for Best Information Series—numerous domestic investigative journalism awards, many New York and Columbus awards, International Emmys, and in 2000 and 2010 the Michener Award, Canada's top journalism prize, which is open to all media and has only one annual winner. A 2003 co-production with The New York Times and PBS's Frontline was recognized with the Pulitzer, Peabody, Polk, and other awards.

The Fifth Estate is one of two television programs (with The Twilight Zone being the first) to win an Academy Award, a prize presented to theatrical films: Just Another Missing Kid, originally a The Fifth Estate episode, was released in theatres in the United States and won the 1982 Academy Award for Documentary Feature.

Controversies

The Savoie scandal
In 1992, The Fifth Estate''' aired an expose of Inspector Claude Savoie of the Royal Canadian Mounted Police, accusing him of being corrupt. On 21 December 1992, Savoie shot himself in his office at the RCMP's headquarters. Many felt that The Fifth Estate bore some responsibility for Savoie's suicide.  Julian Sher of The Fifth Estate who worked on the Savoie story stated in 2022: “I didn’t kill him, I didn’t load the gun, I didn’t put the gun to his head. He made his choices. I’m not responsible but if Dan and I had decided not to do the story, if we had not covered this stuff, would he be alive? He might have decided to kill himself when the RCMP (investigated him)...The lesson I learned from that is the consequences of our work. For many of the people we tell stories about, it’s their lives and sometimes their deaths."

 Libel suit 
The CBC was successfully sued for libel over an episode that aired on 27 February 1996. Two doctors were interviewed for an episode about prescription drugs. Both doctors alleged their interviews were unfairly edited to give the false impression they were involved in kickbacks, cover-ups of patient deaths and other disreputable activities. Cardiologist Martin Meyers asked for an apology plus $25,000, while researcher Frans Leenen asked for an apology plus $10,000. The CBC opted to fight the charges in court. The doctors ultimately prevailed. Myers was awarded $200,000, plus interest and costs, while Leenen won $950,000, plus interest and costs that could total over $2 million, a record for Canadian libel. The CBC has no libel insurance. Judges in both cases ruled that journalists at The Fifth Estate had twisted the facts and acted with malice, with one writing in his decision; "this was sensationalistic journalism of the worst sort and should serve as an embarrassment to this so-called 'flagship' investigative programme." The episode's host Trish Wood, producer Nicholas Regush, the researcher and executive producer David Studer were assessed punitive and aggravated damages.

 Iglesia ni Cristo 
The CBC and The Fifth Estate'' were sued in February 2019 by the Iglesia Ni Cristo after officials said one of the show's broadcasts defamed their church, calling the show "slanderous" and acting "without evidence." CBC News responded by stating they stand behind the story.

The episode in question, "Church of Secrets", which aired on 11 November 2018 and was hosted by Bob McKeown, detailed the controversies surrounding the church, including accusations of financial irregularities, kidnapping, and the murder of a Canadian man. In particular, McKeown interviewed the widow of a murder victim allegedly killed by INC members after a series of verbal altercations, as well as following the story of excommunicated ministerial worker Lowell Menorca II, who sought refugee status in Canada. The news crew also attempted for and were denied an interview with Eduardo V. Manalo after an event in Sacramento. During the attempt for an interview, their vehicle's tires were slashed, which McKeown suspected was an act of intimidation by INC, though an INC member denied the allegation.

Notes

References

External links
 
 
 

1970s Canadian television news shows
1980s Canadian television news shows
1990s Canadian television news shows
2000s Canadian television news shows
2010s Canadian television news shows
2020s Canadian television news shows
2000s Canadian documentary television series
2010s Canadian documentary television series
1975 Canadian television series debuts
Canadian Screen Award-winning television shows
CBC News Network original programming
CBC Television original programming
International Emmy Awards Current Affairs & News winners
Investigative documentary television series